Kanchra Khan is an Indian folk singer from the Manganiar community.

Early life
Kachra Khan was born in Khanayani Village, in the Barmer district of western Rajasthan.

Career
Khan performs at major sufi festivals across the world.

References

Indian male folk singers
Indian Muslims
Living people
Year of birth missing (living people)